The Aurora Awards are granted annually by the Canadian SF and Fantasy Association and SFSF Boreal Inc. The Award for Best Artist was first awarded in 1991 as the Award for Best Artistic Achievement, and changed to its current name in 2012. Whilst the award is open to both English and French language participants, Francophone artists are usually included in the Best Artistic Audiovisual Work category since 2011 when the Aurora and Boreal awards were combined.

Jean-Pierre Normand has the most titles at 6 awards.

Best Artist

Winners and nominees

  *   Winners and joint winners

Création artistique audiovisuelle

Winners and nominees

  *   Winners and joint winners

References

Aurora Awards